Datura discolor, also called the desert thorn-apple, is an herbaceous annual plant native to the Sonoran Desert of western North America, where it grows in sandy soils and washes. All parts of the plant contain a mix of alkaloids that are potentially lethal when enough is ingested. Deaths from careless recreational use of Datura and related plants are frequently reported.

Description 
The species was first described in 1833. The specific epithet , meaning "various colors," refers to its upward-growing trumpet-shaped flowers, which are white in the bell, and pale to dark violet from the narrow part of the bell to the base. Its foliage is light green, and its stalks have conspicuous purple stripes. The ovate-shaped leaves can be whole or toothed.

Datura discolor has large flowers, which makes it attractive for garden cultivation. The flowers open for only one night and wither the following day. The species' natural distribution area stretches from Mexico to the Southwestern U.S., and the Caribbean Islands. It is a sun-loving plant which does well underneath overhanging eaves that can protect its flowers from damage by rainfall.

Toxicity 

All parts of Datura plants contain dangerous levels of poison and may be fatal if ingested by humans or other animals, including livestock and pets. In some places it is illegal to buy, sell or cultivate Datura plants.

References

External links 

 Jepson Manual Treatment
 Photographs of Datura discolor
 CalPhotos photo gallery
 Image of Datura Discolor spiral on PermaculturePhotography.com

discolor
Night-blooming plants
Flora of the Sonoran Deserts
Flora of the California desert regions
Flora of Northwestern Mexico
Flora of the Southwestern United States
Plants described in 1833
Flora of the United States
Flora without expected TNC conservation status